Babatunde Raji Fashola   (born 28 June 1963) is a Nigerian lawyer and politician currently serving as the Federal Minister of Works and Housing of Nigeria. He served two terms as Governor of Lagos State from 29 May 2007 to 29 May 2015.

Early life
Fashola was born on 28 June 1963, in Lagos at Island Maternity Hospital into the family of Ademola Fashola, a former journalist with the Daily Times of Nigeria, and Olufunke Agunbiade, a nurse. He has 12 siblings.

Legal career

Supreme Court 
He was called to the Nigerian Bar as a solicitor and advocate of the Supreme Court of Nigeria in November 1988 after completing the professional training programme at the Nigerian Law School, Lagos which he undertook between 1987 and 1988.

Honours 
Fashola, a Notary Public of the Supreme Court of Nigeria, has received awards and certificates of merit including the Distinguished Alumnus Award conferred on him by the University of Benin Alumni Association. He is also a recipient of Lagos State public service club Platinum Award for outstanding contribution towards development. As well as Alliance for Democracy " Igbogbo Bayeku Local Government Award" in recognition of activities towards the success of the party.

Babatunde Fashola is also a Patron of the Law Students Association of the University of Benin and he is the second law graduate from the University of Benin and the first member of the Nigerian Law School graduating class of 1988 to be conferred with the professional rank of Senior Advocate of Nigeria. Fashola is also the First ever Chief of Staff to be so honoured. Babatunde Fashola is a member of the Nigerian Bar Association, the International Bar Association and an Associate of the Chartered Institute of Taxation of Nigeria.

In October 2022, a Nigerian national honour of Commander of the Order of the Niger (CON) was conferred on him by President Muhammadu Buhari.

Political appointments

Fashola was Chief of Staff to his predecessor, Asiwaju Bola Ahmed Tinubu. Fashola, had during his tenure as Chief of Staff, also dubbed as the Honourable Commissioner to the Governor's office. Babatunde Fashola was the first person to hold both offices simultaneously.

Babatunde Fashola also served in Lagos state in various capacities, including:

 Secretary of the Lands Sub-Committee of the Transitional Work Groups- 1999.
 Member of the panel of Enquiry into allocation of houses on the Mobolaji Johnson Housing Scheme at Lekki.- 2000.
 Member of the State Tenders Board- 2002– 2006.
 Member of the Lagos State Executive Council-2002-2006.
 Member of the State Security Council-2002-2006
 Member of the State Treasury Board-2002-2006
 Chairman Ad-Hoc Committee on the Review of Asset distribution among Local Government.
 Minister of Power, Works and Housing 2015-2019
Minister of Works and Housing 2019 to date

Governor of Lagos state

Fashola was the chief of staff to his predecessor, Asiwaju Bola Ahmed Tinubu.

As the candidate of the Action Congress party, now transformed to the All Progressives Congress party, Fashola succeeded Tinubu as governor of Lagos State on 14 April 2007. Fashola was re-elected on 26 April 2011.

Lagos infrastructural regeneration 
Fashola focused on the rehabilitation of Lagos' infrastructures. These infrastructures had been neglected for years after Abuja was declared the new capital of Nigeria in 1991. The modernisation of Lagos, which Tinubu had begun, accelerated under Fashola's governorship. Both the private and public sectors were involved in the realisation of the project.

Bus Rapid Transit 
Fashola introduced air-conditioned city buses, the BRT buses, for which dedicated lanes were constructed.

Suburban railway 

The "Blue Line" of the suburban railway at the National Theatre.

Fashola initiated the construction of the Lagos Light Rail, the commuter rail of Lagos, the first two lines of which are scheduled for completion in the last quarter of 2022 (as at January 2022).

Highways 
On assuming office, Fashola embarked on a major overhaul of the city's main highways. At the same time, major reconstruction works took place almost everywhere in Lagos. The result was that the Lagos metropolis took on a new look in the first four years of his tenure. Most of the major roads were redesigned and painted. New roads were opened up with flyover bridges. Ultra-modern footbridges were built to replace the old, dilapidated bridges.

Education 
The Fashola government has paid great attention to education. This includes the reinstatement and establishment of well-equipped new classrooms, distribution of free textbooks, provision of well-equipped workrooms and libraries, provision of buses for teachers and students to facilitate transportation, reinstatement of uniformed voluntary administrators in public schools in the state, introduction of a salary scale for teachers in public schools in the state, development of the Adopt a School Initiative and others. The schools that have been repaired include: Ikotun Senior High School, Alimosho Girls High School, Agege Okemagba Junior High School, Mojoda Amuwo Senior Grammar School and Tomia Community Secondary School, Alagbado.

Rural transformation 
The Fashola government has also made great strides in rural areas, with over 110 rural development projects completed under the Rural Water Supply and Sanitation Structure. At the end of 2009, 104 communities were metered for the provision of a modified Type A water system from the Intervention Fund. Some other achievements in the rural sector include: Construction of modern abattoirs in Ologe, Oko-Oba and Lairage. Construction of access roads to link villages at places like Imude road, Shibiri-Etegbin road, Ajangbandi-Illogbo road, Agboroko-Igbo road, Elerin road and Ariyo-Muyo-Tedi Oshun road and so on. The state government has completed 165 rural electrification projects under its rural interference programme.

Reclamation of land 

Fashola embarked on land reclamation without which urban planning would not be possible under the prevailing conditions. This includes Banana Island and Eko Atlantic City, both of which have been filled. Eko Atlantic City is expected to house millions of Lagosians in the future and, unlike the rest of the city, is equipped with sewers, its own electricity supply and other features of a modern city.

City beautification 

In October 2009, Babatunde Fashola inaugurated a garden in honour of the late Professor Ayodele Awojobi at Onike Roundabout, Yaba, Lagos, in the middle of which a statue of the famous academic was placed.

Fashola, as governor, collaborated with artists like Oladejo Victor Akinlonu to enhance and beautify Lagos. Oladejo's works such as the Eyo Masquerade and the bust of Sir Alexander Molade Okoya Thomas were commissioned by the governor.

Public security 
On the road to security, the Fashola government not only transformed most of the hideouts and places that previously served as bases for fraudsters and armed robbers into visually appealing environments. It also established the Lagos State Security Trust Fund to effectively and sustainably fund the security needs of the state.

In June 2007, Babatunde Fashola appointed former Inspector General of Police Musiliu Smith head of the Lagos State Security council, a body charged with taking a holistic look at the anatomy of crime in the state.

Haiti earthquake fund-raising

As soon as Haiti was struck by a magnitude 7.0 Mw earthquake, Babatunde Fashola launched an appeal to raise up to one million US dollars. The funds raised were used to assist the victims of the Haiti quake. As this was in place, the Speaker of the Lagos State House of Assembly, Mr. Adeyemi Ikuforiji, said Nigerians should be prepared in events of natural disasters.

Water safety 
In May 2014, Fashola announced the compulsory use of life jackets on Lagos waterways. In a 2012 accident, ten children from Ijora Awori, Lagos State, drowned while they were being ferried to school, because they were not wearing life jackets.

Controversial eateries tax 
A controversial proposal to charge consumption tax on eateries had been enforced. The matter was taken to court, but the ruling was announced in the government’s favor.

Waste investigation 
In late January 2010, the Lagos State House of Assembly launched an investigation into possible waste of taxpayers' money by Fashola, mainly in connection with the ongoing Eko Atlantic City project. The allegations range from importation of palm trees from Niger for horticulture projects to improper use of contract money involving one of the Lagos State contractors. The group conducting the investigation was known as True Face of Lagos. The final reports were to be submitted on 15 February 2010. During his tenure, True Face of Lagos was later disbanded. Attempts were made to restart the investigation through a petition, but they were repeatedly rejected by the courts.

The fight against Ebola 
Babatunde Raji Fashola's greatest achievement as governor came at the end of his second term in September 2014, when Nigeria was officially declared free of Ebola. Three months earlier, Ebola had first spread in the country when Patrick Sawyer, the infected US-Liberian citizen and ECOWAS official, brought in the virus through Lagos airport.

He personally took control of tracking down and isolating about 1,000 people who were feared to have been infected since Patrick Sawyer's arrival. The Lagos governor cut short a pilgrimage to Mecca, flew home and then set up an Ebola Emergency Operations Centre to take on the daunting task of monitoring all those who might be infected. A team of 2,000 officials was trained for the task and ended up knocking on 26,000 doors. At one point, the governor was briefed by disease control experts up to ten times a day. He made a point of visiting the country's Ebola treatment centre to impress on the Nigerian public that they should not panic unnecessarily.

Ministerial position 
Fashola was appointed Minister of Power, Works and Housing by President Muhammadu Buhari on 11 November 2015; he was appointed Minister of Works and Housing on 21 August 2019.

Completion of the "Second Niger Bridge" 
The Second Niger Bridge at Onitsha, which had been the subject of political debate since the 1980s and was seen as a byword for stagnation, was pushed forward under Fashola and is nearing completion (as of January 2022).

Completion of the Lagos-Ibadan Expressway 
The renovation of the former "pothole test track" from the metropolis of Lagos to Nigeria's third largest city, Ibadan, will also be completed in 2022.

Further 
Fashola counts among other achievements of his ministry in 2021

 The completed motorway between Lagos and Oworonshoki,
 the repair of the Lagos Third Mainland Bridge, and
 the completion of the motorway between the capital, Abuja, and Nigeria's second largest city, Kano.

Eight hundred road contracts had been signed, he said. Currently, 13,000 km of roads are being rehabilitated and 37 bridges are being built.

In the process, he says its budget has been slashed from 260 billion naira in 2015 (€1.17 billion at the time) to 234 billion naira in 2021 (€491 million). According to Fashola, "We are now doing a lot more with less resources."

Evaluation 
Across party lines, Fashola is valued for his expertise.

Personal life 
Fashola is married to Abimbola Fashola. They have two children.

Miscellaneous 
The railway station in the Agege area of Lagos is named after Babatunde Fashola.

See also
 Timeline of Lagos, 2000s–present
List of Governors of Lagos State
List of Yoruba people

References

Politicians from Lagos
1963 births
Living people
Governors of Lagos State
Buhari administration personnel
Action Congress of Nigeria politicians
Senior Advocates of Nigeria
All Progressives Congress politicians
Igbobi College alumni
University of Benin (Nigeria) alumni
Nigerian Muslims
20th-century Nigerian lawyers
21st-century Nigerian lawyers
21st-century Nigerian politicians
Yoruba politicians
Yoruba legal professionals
Lawyers from Lagos
Government ministers of Nigeria